The Globe KD4G Quail was an American target drone, built by the Globe Aircraft Corporation for use by the United States Navy.

Design and development
A catapult-launched, high-wing monoplane, the KD4G was of all-metal construction. The Quail was launched by a catapult; power was supplied by a two-cylinder Kiekhaefer O-45 opposed piston engine producing .

Operational history
The KD4G-1 first flew in 1949; soon afterwards an improved version, the KD4G-2, was introduced, however neither variant was produced in significant numbers.

References

Citations

Bibliography

KD4G
1940s United States special-purpose aircraft
Single-engined tractor aircraft
High-wing aircraft
Target drones of the United States
Aircraft first flown in 1949